Enough Thunder is the fourth solo EP by English dubstep producer and singer-songwriter James Blake. The EP showcases more soul music than the experimental dubstep and electronic sounds of his self-titled debut album.

The EP contains a collaboration with Bon Iver and a Joni Mitchell cover.

The EP was bundled with the deluxe edition of Blake's self-titled debut album, as well as being a standalone release.

Reception
The EP received a 64/100 on Metacritic indicating generally positive reviews. Entertainment Weekly's review stated that "The silky-voiced Brit's Bon Iver-assisted EP is lush enough to be played at a swanky restaurant, but it may be even better suited to an evening alone with a hard drink." Consequence of Sound's Mohammad Choudhery wrote of Blake, "he continues to grow into one of the most compelling musicians today." Pitchfork Media gave it a 6.4/10, commending Blake's "fighting [of] the good fight."

Track listing
All tracks written and produced by James Blake except where noted.

Notes
 "A Case of You" was recorded for BBC Radio 1's Zane Lowe Show, first transmitted 9 February 2011.

Personnel
 James Blake – writing , performance , production , recording 
 Rob McAndrews – guitar 
 Justin Vernon – writing, production 
 Miti Adhikari – production 
 George Thomas – engineer 
 Dan Foat – management, A&R
 Matt Colton – mastering
 Romy Madley Croft – photograph
 Will Bankhead – design

References

External links
 James Blake Official Website
 James Blake on Facebook

2011 EPs
Albums produced by James Blake (musician)
James Blake (musician) albums